B54 or B-54 may refer to :
 B54 (New York City bus), a bus line in Brooklyn
 Blackburn B-54, a British carrier-borne anti-submarine warfare aircraft
 Boeing B-54, an American strategic bomber aircraft
 Bundesstraße 54, a German road
 HLA-B54, an HLA-B serotype
 W54 nuclear warhead, which in one configuration was known as the B54 Special Atomic Demolition Munition (SADM)